Bernard du Bosquet (died 19 April 1371), legum doctor, was a professor at the University of Toulouse from 1350, the Archbishop of Naples from 5 September 1365, and a Cardinal of the Roman Catholic Church as priest of Santi Apostoli  appointed by Pope Urban V on 22 September 1368 until his death. He participated in the Papal conclave of 1370.

Works

References

1371 deaths
14th-century French cardinals
Archbishops of Naples
Year of birth unknown